The 1985 All-Ireland Junior Hurling Championship was the 64th staging of the All-Ireland Junior Championship since its establishment by the Gaelic Athletic Association in 1912.

Kilkenny entered the championship as the defending champions, however, they were beaten in the Leinster Championship.

The All-Ireland final was played on 18 August 1985 at Nowlan Park in Kilkenny, between Wexford and Tipperary, in what was their first ever meeting in a final. Wexford won the match by 3-09 to 1-13 to claim their first ever championship title.

Results

All-Ireland Junior Hurling Championship

All-Ireland semi-finals

All-Ireland final

References

Junior
All-Ireland Junior Hurling Championship